The Army of the Evros was a field army of Greece, stationed in Western Thrace between December 1922 and August 1923.

History
The Army of the Evros was formed following the defeat and evacuation of the Army of Asia Minor from Anatolia in August 1922. Hostilities between Greece and Turkey ceased with the Armistice of Mudanya, but the Armistice obliged the Greek army to evacuate Eastern Thrace (awarded to Greece with the Treaty of Sèvres in 1920) and withdraw behind the Evros river. Negotiations for a final peace treaty began between Greece, Turkey and the Allied Powers in Lausanne, but the resumption of warfare in a new Greco-Turkish war remained a possibility as irreconcilable differences separated the Greek and Turkish positions, especially in the matter of war reparations demanded by the Turkish delegation.

The revolutionary military government that had seized control of Greece in September 1922 immediately set about reorganizing the remnants of the Army of Asia Minor as the "Army of the Evros". This task was undertaken by the capable Lt. General Theodoros Pangalos, who quickly managed to restore order and discipline in the army and form a capable fighting force comprising the II, III and IV Corps.

Plans were even prepared for the crossing of the Evros and the recapture of Eastern Thrace, where the local Turkish forces were considerably outclassed.

In the event, the signature of the Treaty of Lausanne on 24 July 1923 pre-empted the resumption of war, and the Army of the Evros was disbanded soon after. The decision was vehemently opposed by Pangalos, who likened Lausanne to another "Treaty of Antalcidas".

References

Sources
 

Evros
Western Thrace
Military units and formations established in 1922
Military units and formations disestablished in 1923
1920s in Greece